This is a list of actors who appeared in the British spy-fi television series The Avengers between 1961 and 1969 and its sequel The New Avengers between 1976 and 1977. Many of the actors also appeared in ITC Entertainment productions such as The Saint, Danger Man, The Baron, The Champions, The Prisoner, Man in a Suitcase, Department S, The Persuaders!, The Protectors, and Randall and Hopkirk (Deceased). Several of the actors listed may have guest-starred in more than one episode across the six seasons of the production.

Main cast

☆ Emma Peel also appeared in the first episode of The Avengers Series 6, and archive footage of her was used in one episode of the second series of The New Avengers.

Recurring cast

A

 Fredric Abbott
 Joss Ackland
 Ronald Adam
 Tom Adams
 Trevor Adams
 Raymond Adamson
 Anthony Ainley
 Geoffrey Alexander
 Keith Alexander
 Maev Alexander
 Terence Alexander
 Eric Allen
 Patrick Allen
 Ronald Allen
 Wendy Allnutt
 Jack Allouis
 Nicholas Amer
 Iain Anders
 Daphne Anderson
 David Anderson
 Esther Anderson
 Keith Anderson
 Maria Andipa
 Annette Andre
 Margo Andrew
 David Andrews
 Paul Anil
 Brian Anthony
 Philip Anthony
 Edwin Apps
 Bernard Archard
 Nigel Arkwright
 Peter Arkroyd
 Graham Armitage
 Alun Armstrong
 Ray Armstrong
 Julia Arnall
 Peter Arne
 Grace Arnold
 Graham Ashley
 Kitty Atwood
 Harvey Ashby
 Graham Ashley
 Harvey Atkin
 Coral Atkins
 John Atkinson
 Liane Aukin
 Ray Austin
 Roger Avon

B

 Brian Badcoe
 Robert G. Bahey
 Anthony Bailey
 John Bailey
 Redmond Bailey
 Anthony Baird
 John Baker
 Mark Baker
 Michael Balfour
Michael Ball
 Ralph Ball
 Freda Bamford
 Trevor Bannister
 Gillian Barclay
 John Barcroft
 Eric Barker
 Ronnie Barker
 Peter Barkworth
 Bruno Barnabe
 David Baron
 Patrick Barr
 John Barrard
 Jane Barratt
 Reginald Barratt
 Arthur Barrett

 Ray Barrett
 Tim Barrett
 Frank Barringer
 Michael Barrington
 John Barron
 Keith Barron
 Kevin Barry
 Anthony Bate
 Geoffrey Bateman
 Timothy Bateson
 David Bauer
 Beryl Baxter
 Keith Baxter
 Trevor Baxter
 Geoffrey Bayldon
 Peter Bayliss
 Sally Bazely
 Robert Beatty
 Richard Bebb
 Michael Beint
 James Belchamber
 Ann Bell
 Valerie Bell
 Len Belmont
 Kenneth Benda
 Christopher Benjamin
 John Bennett
 George Benson
 Hamlyn Benson
 Harold Berens
 Dawn Beret
 Ballard Berkeley
 Steven Berkoff
 Robert Bernal
Cyrille Bernard
John Bethune
 Sylvia Bidmead
 Michael Bilton
 Charles Bird
 David Bird
 Norman Bird
 Penny Bird
 Cynthia Bizeray
 Isobel Black
Jo Black
 Honor Blackman
 Anthony Blackshaw
 Douglas Blackwell
 Isla Blair
 Katherine Blake
 Alban Blakelock
 Colin Blakely
 Caroline Blakiston
Dennis Blanch
 Joby Blanshard
 Brian Blessed
 Newton Blick
 John Bluthal
 Peter Blythe
 Bruce Boa
 Gary Bond
 Philip Bond
Franck-Olivier Bonnet
 Antony Booth
 Roger Booth
Peter Boretski
 Peter Bourne
 Lally Bowers
 Norman Bowler
 Peter Bowles
 Gordon Boyd
 Roy Boyd
 Carol Boyer
Tommy Boyle
 Wilfred Boyle
Andrew Bradford
 Irene Bradshaw
 Brandon Brady
 Terence Brady
 Edward Brayshaw
 James Bree
 Kevin Brennan
 Terry Brewer
 Tim Brinton
Maj Britt
 Peter Bromilow
 Sydney Bromley
 Lyndon Brook
 Ray Brooks
 A. J. Brown
 Bernard Brown
 Edwin Brown
Murray Brown
 Ray Brown
 Robert Brown
 William Lyon Brown
 Angela Browne
 Ray Browne
 Alan Browning
 Maurice Browning
 Michael Browning
 Graham Bruce
 Judy Bruce
 Robert Bruce
 William Buck
 Denise Buckley
 Keith Buckley
 Hugh Burden
 Alfred Burke
 David Burke
Yanci Burkovek
 Jonathan Burn
 Edward Burnham
 Jeremy Burnham
 Larry Burns
 Lionel Burns
 Mark Burns
 Sheila Burrell
 Peter Burton
Raymond Bussières
 Richard Butler
 Janet Butlin
 Kathleen Byron

C

 Edward Caddick
 John Cairney
 David Calderisi
 Richard Caldicot
 Gavin Campbell
 Annette Carell
 Joyce Carey
 David Cargill
 Patrick Cargill
Les Carison
 John Carlisle
 Charles Carson
 John Carson
Eric Carte
 John Cartney
 Heron Carvic
 Allan Casley
 John Castle
 Susan Castle
 John Cater
 Pearl Catlin
 Tony Caunter
 Dallas Cavell
 Roger Cawdren
 Robert Cawdron
 John Cazabon
 Peter Cellier
 Naomi Chance
 Julian Chagrin
 John Chandos
 Constance Chapman
 Norman Chappell
 Vincent Charles
 Geoffrey Chater
 Cecil Cheung
 Jeremy Child
 Dennis Chinnery
 Chris Chittell aka Christopher Chittell
 Joyce Wong Chong
 Alan Chuntz
 John Church
Diane Churchill
 George Chuvalo
 Diane Clare
 Ian Clark
 Richard Clarke
 Warren Clarke
 Jean Claudio
 Peter Clay
 Virginia Clay
 Denis Cleary
 John Cleese
 Carol Cleveland
Krishna Clough
 Jennifer Clulow
 John Cobner
 Emma Cochrane
 Noel Coleman
 Richard Coleman
 Sylvia Coleridge
 Michael Coles
 Ian Colin
 Christopher Coll
 Kenneth Colley
 Patience Collier
 Clive Colin-Bowler
 Lewis Collins
 Michael Collins
 Geoffrey Colville
 John Comer
 Tim Condren
 Miranda Connell
 Edric Connor
 Patrick Connor
 Jan Conrad
 Pamela Conway
 George A. Cooper
 Kenneth Cope
 James Copeland
 Paul Copley
 Peter Copley
Don Corbett
 Michael Corcoran
 Delia Corrie
 James Cossins
 Nicholas Courtney
Suzette Couture
 John Cowley
 Brenda Cowling
 Arthur Cox
 Clifford Cox
Gerald Crack
 Gerry Crampton
 Les Crawford
Sandy Crawley
 Jack Creley
 Bernard Cribbins
 John Crocker
 Gerald Cross
 Hugh Cross
 Larry Cross
 Brian Croucher
 Jennifer Croxton
 Michael Culver
 Bill Cummings
 Douglas Cummings
 Anthony Cundell
 Anna Cunningham
 Ian Cunningham
 Margo Cunningham
 Richard Curnock
 Roland Curram
 Ian Curry
 Shaun Curry
 Alan Curtis
 Lucinda Curtis
 Peter Cushing
 Allan Cuthbertson
 Iain Cuthbertson

D

 Joanne Dainton
 Andre Daker
 Amy Dalby
 Stuart Damon
 Paul Danquah
 Nigel Davenport
 Michael David
Richard Davidson
 David Davies
 Griffith Davies
 Alexander Davion
 Noel Davis
Rowland Davis
 Pamela Ann Davy
 Anthony Dawes
 Paul Dawkins
 Ivor Dean
 Robert Dean
 John Dearth
 Guy Deghby
 David de Keyser
 Reed De Rouen
 Edward de Souza
 Hugo de Vernier
 Francis de Wolff
 Felix Deebank
Paul Emile Deiber
 Pauline Delaney
 Aimée Delamain
Christine Delarouche
 Roger Delgado
 Carmen Dene
 Zulema Dene
 Peter Dennis
 Edward Dentith
 Jay Denver
 Patricia Denys
 Robert Desmond
 Ed Devereaux
 J. G. Devlin
 William Devin
 Arnold Diamond
 Marian Diamond
 Peter Diamond
 Cliff Diggins
 Arthur Dignam
 Basil Dignam
 Vernon Dobtcheff
 Eric Dodson
Leo Dolan
 Guy Doleman
Michael Donaghue
 Donal Donnelly
 James Donnelly
 Sandra Dorne
Trude van Dorne
 Angela Douglas
 Donald Douglas
 Fabia Drake
 Gabrielle Drake
 Vivienne Drummond
 Anulka Dubinska
 Carl Duering
 Philip Dunbar
 Lindsay Duncan
 Clive Dunn
 Rosemarie Dunham
Joe Dunne
 Ruth Dunning
 Storm Durr
 Anthony Dutton
 Valentine Dyall
 Hamilton Dyce

E

 Leon Eagles
 Clifford Earl
Annegret Easterman
 Donald Eccles
 Paul Eddington
 Mark Eden
 Dennis Edwards
 Glynn Edwards
Ray Edwards
 Sandor Elès
 Terry Eliot
 Clifford Elkin
 Eric Elliott
 Peter J. Elliott
 Colin Ellis
 William Ellis
 Catherine Ellison
 Jonathan Elsom
 Mark Elwes
 Michael Elwyn
 Patricia English
 Hedi Erich
 Clifford Evans
 Tenniel Evans

F

 John Falconer
 James Falkland
 Rio Fanning
 Frederick Farley
 Derek Farr
 Charles Farrell
 Kenneth Farrington
 Trader Faulkner
 Michael Faure
 Sheila Fearn
 Sandra Fehr
 Christina Ferdinando
 Fred Ferris
 Fenella Fielding
 Jon Finch
 Martin Fisk
 Lucy Fleming
Robert Fleming
 Robert Flemying
 John Flint
 Eric Flynn
 Peter Fontaine
 Scott Forbes
 John Forbes-Robertson
 Karen Ford
 Michael Forrest
 John Forgeham
 Denis Forsyth
 Dudley Foster
Celia Fox
 Edward Fox
 William Fox
 Derek Francis
 Susan Franklin
 William Franklyn
 Alice Fraser
 Bill Fraser
 Liz Fraser
 Ronald Fraser
 John Frawley
 Leslie French
 Martin Friend
 Tex Fuller
 Lynn Furlong

G

 Liam Gaffney
 Richard Gale
 Ian Gardiner
 Gordon Gardner
 Jimmy Gardner
 John Garrie
 David Garth
 Frank Gatliff
 John Gatrell
 William Gaunt
 John Gayford
 Eunice Gayson
 Donald Gee
 Achilles Geogiou
 Alan Gerrard
 Philip Gilbert
 John Gill
 Tom Gill
 Paul Gillard
 Robert Gillespie
 Toni Gilpin
 Leslie Glazer
 David Glover
 Julian Glover
 John Glyn-Jones
 Willoughby Goddard
 George Goderick
 Anne Godfrey
 Derek Godfrey
Peter Godfrey
 Tommy Godfrey
 Anne Godley
 James Goei
 Michael Goldie
 Bernard Goldman
 Maurice Good
 Michael Goodliffe
 Lyndhall Goodman
 Harold Goodwin
 Howard Goorney
 Michael Gough
 Michael Gover
 Hazel Graeme
 Clive Graham
 David Graham
 Janine Gray
 Willoughby Gray
 Richard Graydon
 Nigel Green
 Leon Greene
 John Greenwood
 Katy Greenwood
 David Gregory
 Rowena Gregory
 David Greif
 Stephen Greif
 Joseph Greig
 David Grey
 Arthur Griffiths
 Paul Grist
 Jack Grossman
 Stefan Gryff
 Philip Guard
 Basil Das Gupta
 Lionel Guyett
 Jack Gwillim
 Michael Gwynn

H

 Pearl Hackney
 Ingrid Hafner
 Fred Haggerty
 Brian Haines
 Patricia Haines
 Harvey Hall
 Neil Hallett
 Peter Halliday
 Ann Hamilton
 Roger Hammond
 Sheila Hammons
 Prentis Hancock
 Stephen Hancock
 Brian Hankins
 Paul Hansard
 Vincent Harding
 Paul Hardwick
 Laurence Hardy
 Doris Hare
 Janet Hargreaves
 Juliet Harmer
 Gerald Harper
 Robert Harris
 David Hart
 Fiona Hartford
 Robert Hartley
 Louis Haslar
 Imogen Hassall
 Ken Haward
 Jeremy Hawk
 Michael Hawkins
 Murray Hayne
 James Hayter
 Alan Haywood
 Mark Heath
Anthony Heaton
 Maurice Hedley
 John G. Heller
 Ian Hendry
 Drewe Henley
 Joyce Heron
 Arthur Hewlett
 Donald Hewlett
 Edward Higgins
 Ronald Hines
 Andy Ho
 Carleton Hobbs
 Charles Hodgson
 Jan Holden
 Sue Holderness
 John Hollis
 Julian Holloway
 Patrick Holt
 Ewan Hooper
 Gary Hope
 Ray Hope
Basil Hopkins
 Penelope Horner
 David Horovitch
 Walter Horsbrugh
 Bernard Horsfall
 John Horsley
 Basil Hoskins
 Charles Houston
 Arthur Howard
Michael Howarth
 Arthur Howell
 Peter Howell
 Noel Howlett
 Stephen Hubay
 Walter Hudd
 Vanda Hudson
 Neville Hughes
 Peter Hughes
 Gareth Hunt
 Michael Hunt
 Alistair Hunter
 Richard Hurndall
 John Hussey
 Harry Hutchinson
 Ric Hutton

I

 Barrie Ingham
 George Innes
 Harold Innocent
 Richard Ireson

J

 Barry Jackson
 Brian Jackson
 David Jackson
 Gordon Jackson
 Frederick Jaeger
 Lawrence James
 Godfrey James
 Robert James
 Jerry Jardin
 Stanley Jay
 Colin Jeavons
 Peter Jeffrey
 Margo Jenkins
 Peter Jesson
 Reginald Jessup
 Jimmy Jewel
 Edward Jewesbury
 William Job
 Mervyn Johns
 Stratford Johns
 Bari Johnson
 Alf Joint
 Freddie Jones
 Griffith Jones
 Hayden Jones
 Jacqueline Jones
 Joanna Jones
 Langton Jones
 Mark Jones
 Norman Jones
 Peter Jones
 Rick Jones
 Yootha Joyce
 Edward Judd
 John Junkin

K

 Harold Kasket
 Maurice Kaufmann
 Patrick Kavanagh
 Bernard Kay
 Sylvia Kay
 Barry Keegan
 Kenneth Keeling
 Kevin Keeling
 Andrew Keir
 Penelope Keith
 Clare Kelly
 Edward Kelsey
 Tom Kempinski
 Jo Kendall
 William Kendall
 Bryan Kendrick
 David Kernan
 Annette Kerr
 James Kerry
 Sara Kestelman
 Marjori Keys
 Delena Kidd
 John Kidd
 Diana King
 Mark Kingston
 Roy Kinnear
 Teddy Kiss
 Gertan Klauber
 Richard Klee
 Freda Knorr
 Kristopher Kum
 Burt Kwouk
 Thomas Kyffin

L

 Ronald Lacey
 Simon Lack
 Alan Lake
 Charles Lamb
 Larry Lamb
 Tony Lambden
 Annie Lambert
 Jack Lambert
 Lloyd Lamble
 Duncan Lamont
 Dinsdale Landen
 Harry Landis
 Avice Landone
George Lane-Cooper
 Robert Lang
 Terence Langdon
 Sylvia Langova
 David Langton
 Robert Lankesheer
 Philip Latham
 Michael Latimer
Ronnie Laughlin
 Andrew Laurence
 John Laurie
 Jon Laurimore
 Delphi Lawrence
 Sarah Lawson
 Geoff L'Cise
 John Le Mesurier
 Christopher Lee
 The Dave Lee Trio
 John Lee
 Penelope Lee
 Robert Lee
 Michael Lees
 Richard Leech
 Leggo
Don Legros
 Laurie Leigh
 Ronald Leigh-Hunt
 Tutte Lemkow
 Doug Lennox
 Valerie Leon
 Barry Letts
 Humphrey Lestocq
 Phillip Levene
 Annabel Leventon
 Mike Lewin
 Gillian Lewis
 Rhoda Lewis
 Albert Lieven
Marilyn Lighthouse
 Pik-Sen Lim
 Jennie Linden
 Cec Linder
 Helen Lindsay
 Barry Linehan
 Barbara Yu Ling
Ruby Lipp
 Moira Lister
 George Little
 Jeremy Lloyd
 Sue Lloyd
 Suzanne Lloyd
 Charles Lloyd-Pack
 Philip Locke
 David Lodge
 Terence Lodge
 Michael Logan
 Matthew Long
 Terence Longdon
 Justine Lord
 Enid Lorimer
 Nita Lorraine
 Arthur Lovegrove
 Dyson Lovell
 Arthur Lowe
 Barry Lowe
 John Lowe
 Olga Lowe
 William Lucas
 Joanna Lumley
 Michael Lynch
 Genevieve Lyons

M

 Rory MacDermot
 Aimi MacDonald
 Maria Machado
 John MacGowan
 Oliver MacGreevy
 Fulton Mackay
 Alan MacNaughtan
 Patrick Macnee
 Duncan Macrae
 Peter Mackriel
 Peter Madden
 Victor Maddern
 Philip Madoc
 Patrick Magee
 Frank Maher
 Terry Maidment
Maxine Mailfort
Guy Mairesse
 Marne Maitland
 Patrick Malahide
 Andreas Malandrinos
 Kevork Malikyan
 Jane Mallett
 Alec Mango
 Marika Mann
 Hugh Manning
 Ronald Mansell
 Howard Marion-Crawford
 Marcella Markham
 Arnold Marlé
 William Marlowe
 Richard Marner
 Nina Marriott
Maurice Marsac
 Roy Marsden
 Makki Marseilles
 Garry Marsh
 Keith Marsh
 Reginald Marsh
 Bryan Marshall
 Peggy Marshall
 Neville Marten
 Marina Martin
 Maurice Martin
 Paul Massie
 Alan Mason
 Francis Matthews
 James Maxwell
 Lois Maxwell
 Roger Maxwell
 Sarah Maxwell
 Jack May
 Ronald Mayer
 Ferdy Mayne
 Murray Mayne
 Ray McAnally
 Eric McCaine
 Helena McCarthy
 Neil McCarthy
 John McClaren
 Allan McClelland
 Gillian McCutcheon
 Alex McDonald
 Henry McGee
Rony McHale
 Ellen McIntosh
 T. P. McKenna
 Michael McKevit
Dwayne McLean
 Ian McNaughton
 Michael McStay
 Dan Meaden
 Stanley Meadows
 Jill Melford
 Michael Mellinger
 Murray Melvin
 Mary Merrall
 George Merritt
 Jane Merrow
 Ralph Michael
 Frank Middlemass
 Olive Milbourne
 Robert Mill
 Mandy Miller
Giles Millinaire
Charles Millot
 Frank Mills
 Bettine Milne
 Billy Milton
 Isa Mirander
 Warren Mitchell
 Geraldine Moffat
Richard Moffatt
 Zia Mohyeddin
 June Monkhouse
Jacques Monnet
 Phillip Monnet
 Richard Montez
 Ron Moody
 John Moore
 Stephen Moore
 Donald Morley
 André Morell
 Charles Morgan
 Garfield Morgan
 David Morrell
 Artro Morris
 Aubrey Morris
 Robert Morris
 Wolfe Morris
 Hugh Morton
 Philip Mosca
 Bryan Mosley
 Patrick Mower
 Hugh Moxey
 Michael Moyer
 Daniel Moynihan
 Douglas Muir
 Gillian Muir
 Declan Mulholland
 Caroline Munro
 George Murcell
 Richard Murdoch
 Brian Murphy
 June Murphy
 Elizabeth Murray
 Valentino Musetti
Jan Muzynski

N

Yasuko Naggazumi
 Bill Nagy
 Margaret Neale
 Herbert Nelson
 Sally Nesbitt
 David Nettheim
 John Nettleton
 Derek Newark
 Patrick Newell
 Anthony Newlands
 Anthony Nicholls
David Nichols
Nick Nichols
 Nora Nicholson
 Michael Nightingale
 Ralph Nossek

O

 Simon Oates
 Maurice O'Connell
 Ian Ogilvy
 Frank Olegario
 April Olrich
 Kate O'Mara
 Zorenah Osborne
 Valerie Van Ost
 Brian Oulton
 Richard Owens

P

 Nicola Pagett
 Louise Pajo
 Anna Palk
 Jackie Pallo
 Bert Palmer
 Geoffrey Palmer
 Malou Pantera
 Judy Parfitt
 Cecil Parker
 Rhonda Parker
Anthony Parr
 Ken Parry
 George Pastell
 Roy Patrick
 Lee Patterson
 John Paul
 Julie Paulle
 Lisa Peake
 Michael Peake
 Jacqueline Pearce
 Frank Peisley
 Ron Pember
 Arthur Pentelow
 Morris Perry
 Jon Pertwee
 Richard Pescud
Brian Petchy
 Frank Peters
 Edward Petherbridge
Michael Petrovitch
 Redmond Phillip
 Conrad Phillips
 John Phillips
Neil Phillips
 Robin Phillips
 Gordon Phillott
 Donald Pickering
 Vivian Pickles
 Sacha Pitoëff
 Leslie Pitt
 Norman Pitt
 Victor Platt
 Stanley Platts
 Terry Plummer
 Steve Plytas
 Eric Pohlmann
 Christine Pollon
 Peter Porteous
 John Porter-Davison
 Nyree Dawn Porter
 Denny Powell
 Eddie Powell
 Nosher Powell
 George Pravda
 Dennis Price
 Hilary Pritchard
 Reg Pritchard
 David Purcell
 Noel Purcell
 Roy Purcell
 Bruce Purchase
Robert Putt
 Keith Pyott
Toivo Pyyko

Q

 Anna Quayle
 Godfrey Quigley
 Denis Quilley
 David Quilter
 Oscar Quitak

R

 Ronald Radd
 Charlotte Rampling
 Louise Ramsay
 Bernice Rassin
 Gary Raymond
 Harry Rayner
 Corin Redgrave
 Liam Redmond
 Moira Redmond
 Geoffrey Reed
 Tracy Reed
 Angharad Rees
 Amanda Reeves
 Kynaston Reeves
 Nadja Regin
 Trevor Reid
 Dora Reisser
 Cyril Renison
 Clive Revill
Denise Reynolds
 Peter Reynolds
 Terry Richard
 Aubrey Richards
 David Richards
Peter Richardson
 Edwin Richfield
 Nigel Rideout
 Arnold Ridley
 Robert Rietti aka Robert Rietty
 Graham Rigby
 Diana Rigg
 John Ringham
 Colin Rix
 Ewan Roberts
 Nancy Roberts
 Christopher Robbie
 Michael Robbins
 Elisabeth Robillard
 Shiela Robins
 Cardew Robinson
 Doug Robinson
 Joe Robinson
 Neil Robinson
 Christian Roberts
 George Roderick
 Ilona Rodgers
 Anthony Rogers
 Doris Rogers
 Mitzi Rogers
 Jack Rodney
 Jean Roland
 Alan Rolfe
 Guy Rolfe
 Jon Rollason
 Gordon Rollings
 John Ronane
 Edina Ronay
 Adrian Ropes
 Alec Ross
 Harry Ross
 Phillip Ross
 Leonard Rossiter
 George Roubicek
 Patsy Rowlands
 Deep Roy
 Anthony Roye
 Jan Rubeš
Les Rubie
 John Ruddock
 Jenny Runacre
 Geoffrey Russell
 Iris Russell
 Malcolm Russell
 Robert Russell
 Ronald Russell
 Anne Rutter
 Madge Ryan
 Ann Rye
 Douglas Rye

S

 Anthony Sagar
 John Salew
 Peter Sallis
 Ivor Salter
 Leslie Sands
 Robert Sansom
 Mike Sarne
 Valerie Sarruf
 John Savident
 Norman Scace
 August Schellenberg
 Frederick Schiller
 David Schofield
 Alex Scott
 Harold Scott
 John Murray Scott
 John Scott
 Steven Scott
 Angela Scoular
 Alison Seebohm
 Frank Seimen
 Johnny Sekka
 Tony Selby
 Elizabeth Sellars
 George Selway
 Charlotte Selwyn
 Bernard Severn
 Terence Sewards
 Athene Seyler
 Harry Shacklock
 Ian Shand
 Anthony Sharp
 John Sharp
 Christine Shaw
 Denis Shaw
 Martin Shaw
 Michael Sheard
 Willie Shearer
 Nicole Shelby
 Doug Sheldon
 Barbara Shelley
 Carole Shelley
 Frank Shelley
 Deanna Shendery
 Elizabeth Shepherd
 Pauline Shepherd
 W. Morgan Sheppard
 Vladek Sheybal
 Yvonne Shima
 Bill Shine (actor)
 Robert Sidaway
 Ann Sidney
 Frank Sieman
 Gerald Sim
Alberto Simeno
Patrick Sinclair
 Campbell Singer
 Colin Skeaping
 Astor Sklair
Ina Skriver
 Patsy Smart
 Nicholas Smith
 Sally Smith
 Terence Soall
 Jayne Sofiano
 Julian Somers
 Henry Soskin
 Pat Spencer
 Sally-Jane Spencer
 Neil Stacy
 Henry Stamper
 John Standing
 Barry Stanton
 Valerie Stanton
Bill Star
 Gail Starforth
 Paul Stassino
 Tony Steedman
Bernice Stegers
 Peter Stephens
 Pamela Stephenson
 Jeanette Sterke
 Gordon Sterne
 Dorinda Stevens
 Julie Stevens
 Ronnie Stevens
 Monica Stevenson
 Jack Stewart
 Roy Stewart
 Nigel Stock
 Malcolm Stoddard
 John Stone
 Philip Stone
 Kevin Stoney
 John Stratton
 Melissa Stribling
 Virginia Stride
 Veronica Strong
 Didi Sullivan
 Sean Sullivan
 David Sumner
 Geoffrey Sumner
 Donald Sutherland
 David Sutton
 Dudley Sutton
 William Swan
 Peter Swanwick
 Walter Swash
 David Swift

T

 Hira Talfrey
 Donald Tandy
Terry Taplin
 John Tate
Davina Taylor
 Grant Taylor
 Gwen Taylor
 Larry Taylor
 Lynn Taylor
 Malcolm Taylor
 Rocky Taylor
Robert Tayman
 Leon Thau
 John Thaw
 Tony Then
 June Thody
 Gareth Thomas
 Peter Thomas
 Talfryn Thomas
 Eric Thompson
 Daniel Thorndike
 Angela Thorne
 Frank Thornton
 Richard Thorp
 Linda Thorson
 Royston Tickner
 Bud Tingwell
 Ann Tirard
 Robin Tolhurst
 Geoffrey Toone
 Peter Torokvei
 Harry Towb
 Toke Townley
 Chris Tranchell
 Susan Travers
Noel Trevarthen
 Frederick Treves
 Ruth Trouncer
 Michael Trubshawe
 Michael Turner
 Yolande Turner
 Meier Tzelniker

U
Steve Ubels
 Edward Underdown
 Robert Urquhart

V

 Anthony Valentine
 Tony Van Bridge
 Gabby Vargas
 Brian Vaughan
 Peter Vaughan
 Wanda Ventham
 Pierre Vernier
 Richard Vernon
 James Villiers
 Neil Vipond
 Tony Vogel
 Vlasta Vrána
 Johnny Vyvyan

W

 Charles Wade
 Joanna Wake
Gary Waldron
 Danvers Walker
 Hedger Wallace
 Bill Wallis
 Desmond Walter-Ellis
 Hugh Walters
 Thorley Walters
 Carole Ward
 Dervis Ward
 Georgina Ward
 Haydn Ward
 Michael Ward
 Pamela Wardel
 Derek Waring
 Richard Warner
 Barry Warren
 Kenneth J. Warren
 Russell Waters
 Gary Watson
 Jack Watson
 Kenneth Watson
 Moray Watson
 Richard Wattis
 Gwendolyn Watts
John Watts
 David Webb
 Donald Webster
 Joy Webster
 Jerold Wells
 John Wentworth
 Robin Wentworth
Allen Weston
 Patrick Westwood
 Alan Wheatley
 Lionel Wheeler
 Carol White
Jason White
 Geoffrey Whitehead
 Reg Whitehead
 Gordon Whiting
 Margaret Whiting
 Paul Whitsun-Jones
 Katy Wild
 Brian Wilde
 Colette Wilde
 William Wilde
 Theodore Wilhelm
 Jeremy Wilkin
 Brook Williams
 Alister Williamson
 Jerome Willis
 Anneke Wills
 Douglas Wilmer
 Barry Wilsher
 Ian Wilson
 Neil Wilson
 Ronald Wilson
 Anthea Windham
 Frank Windsor
 Vic Wise
 Hilary Wontner
 David Wood
 Jennifer Wood
 John Wood
 Joy Wood
Terry Wood
 Terence Woodfield
 John Woodnutt
 Catherine Woodville
 John Woodvine
 Eric Woof
 Jack Woolgar
 Edgar Wreford
 Tony Wright
 Kathja Wyeth
 Blaise Wyndham
 Peter Wyngarde
Ken Wynne
 Michael Wynne
 Norman Wynne

Y

 Terry Yorke
 Eric Young
 Jeremy Young
 Richard Young
 Robert Young

Z
 Peter Zander
 Louis Zorich

References
 Names taken from The Complete Avengers by Dave Rogers 

Avengers
Avengers
Cast members